Troy is the name of several settlements in the U.S. state of Wisconsin:
Troy, Sauk County, Wisconsin, a town
Troy, St. Croix County, Wisconsin, a town
Troy, Walworth County, Wisconsin, a town
Troy (community), Walworth County, Wisconsin, an unincorporated community
Troy Center, Wisconsin, an unincorporated community

See also
East Troy, Wisconsin, a village
East Troy (town), Wisconsin, a town
Troy, Wisconsin is also a ghost town in Douglas County, Wisconsin.